DeRuyter  is a town in Madison County, New York, United States. The population was 1,589 at the 2010 census. The town is named after Michiel Adriaenszoon de Ruyter, a famous admiral in the Dutch navy.  The name de Ruyter (de Ruĳter) means "the Rider".

The Town of DeRuyter has a village in it also called DeRuyter. The town is in the southwestern corner of the county.

An early settler was Elijah Cornell, father of Ezra Cornell, founder of Western Union and Cornell University.

History 

DeRuyter was one of five towns formed before Madison County was created. It was established by a partition of the Town of Cazenovia in 1798. DeRuyter is in the southwestern corner of the county. The town is part of a region called "The Gore," a territory created by a surveying error.

Previous to 1795, DeRuyter was included in the town of Whitestown and was part of the "Lincklaen Purchase". "Tromp Township" was the original name given by John Lincklaen, a Holland Land Agent in honor of a fellow countryman, Admiral Maarten Tromp. The new town of DeRuyter was formed on March 15, 1798. Jan Lincklaen once again named it in honor of a fellow countryman, Admiral Michiel DeRuyter.
 
The Village of DeRuyter was incorporated in 1833.
 
Ezra Cornell, founder of Cornell University re-located from Westchester, New York to DeRuyter in 1819.
 
Sig Sautelle's Circus wintered and trained in DeRuyter from 1896 to the early 1900s.
 
The first Four-County Fair (Cortland, Madison, Chenango and Onondaga) was held in DeRuyter in 1908. The first DeRuyter Fireman's Fair was held in 1927.

Education

Primary and secondary schools

Public schools
The DeRuyter Central School District is located on the eastern edge of the village on Railroad Street. DeRuyter Central School is a public school district located in southwestern Madison County. The school houses grades K-12. The current school enrollment is approximately 380 students from the area. The DeRuyter Central School district includes students from DeRuyter, Sheds, Cuyler (in Cortland County) and Lincklaen (in Chenango County).

Geography
The western town line forms a border with Onondaga and Cortland counties. The southern town line is the border of Chenango County.

According to the United States Census Bureau, the town has a total area of 31.3 square miles (81.0 km2), of which 30.5 square miles (79.0 km2)  is land and 0.8 square mile (2.0 km2)  (2.49%) is water.

Demographics

As of the census of 2000, there were 1,532 people, 592 households, and 412 families residing in the town.  The population density was 50.2 people per square mile (19.4/km2).  There were 867 housing units at an average density of 28.4 per square mile (11.0/km2).  The racial makeup of the town was 97.06% White, 1.31% Black or African American, 0.26% Native American, 0.39% Asian, 0.07% from other races, and 0.91% from two or more races. Hispanic or Latino of any race were 0.33% of the population.

There were 592 households, out of which 31.3% had children under the age of 18 living with them, 56.9% were married couples living together, 8.6% had a female householder with no husband present, and 30.4% were non-families. 25.2% of all households were made up of individuals, and 12.5% had someone living alone who was 65 years of age or older.  The average household size was 2.59 and the average family size was 3.08.

In the town, the population was spread out, with 27.0% under the age of 18, 6.9% from 18 to 24, 26.7% from 25 to 44, 24.8% from 45 to 64, and 14.6% who were 65 years of age or older.  The median age was 38 years. For every 100 females, there were 93.9 males.  For every 100 females age 18 and over, there were 93.8 males.

The median income for a household in the town was $34,911, and the median income for a family was $41,417. Males had a median income of $30,909 versus $22,063 for females. The per capita income for the town was $17,339.  About 7.3% of families and 11.8% of the population were below the poverty line, including 12.7% of those under age 18 and 10.9% of those age 65 or over.

Communities and locations in the Town of DeRuyter 
DeRuyter – A village located in the southwestern corner of the town on Route 13.
DeRuyter Reservoir – A reservoir in the northwestern corner of the town, one of the largest in the area. Although it is a reservoir, it is commonly called "DeRuyter Lake."
Puckerville – A hamlet in the southwestern corner of the town and northeast of DeRuyter village on Route 13.
Quaker Settlement or Quaker Basin – A location in the southeastern corner of the town on Route 58 and east of DeRuyter village.
Sheds – A hamlet in the northeastern corner of the town at Routes 13, 60, and 80.
Sheds Corners – A hamlet southwest of Sheds on Route 13.

Notable people
 Francis Marion Burdick – American legal scholar
 Lyman Gage – Secretary of the Treasury

References

External links
http://www.deruyternygov.us/
 Early DeRuyter history
DeRuyter Lake Association

Syracuse metropolitan area
1798 establishments in New York (state)
Towns in Madison County, New York
Populated places established in 1798